TWDC may refer to:

The Walt Disney Company, an American multinational entertainment and media conglomerate
Tsuen Wan District Council, the district council for the Tsuen Wan District in Hong Kong